Noel Johnson (July 7, 1899 – January 21, 1996) was an advanced age marathon runner and athlete who set a number of records in the New York City Marathon and the Senior Olympics.

Earlier life
Johnson was born in Heron Lake, Minnesota. He supported himself during the great depression as a professional boxer. Boxrec records of his bouts are incomplete. He later moved to San Diego, married, and worked for Convair.

Life as a senior athlete
Later a widower, he was told by his doctors at age 70 that he had only six months to live. Embarking on a new life of diet, exercise,
weight training, isometrics, walking, and marathon running, he became the premiere athlete in the 65 and over age group in the United States.
His diet included eating fresh raw bee pollen. He appeared on over a million Wheaties boxes in 1977.

Accomplishments and awards
Johnson was a regular participant in the Senior Olympics. In 1979, he dazzled the competition by winning gold medals in the marathon, the mile, 13000 meters, and in boxing—where he won the final at age 79 by decking his 40-year-old opponent. Even more amazing was the fact that his opponent was wearing headgear. Johnson was not. He ran marathons across the United States and around the world. He was awarded the Presidential Award for Physical Fitness by President Ronald Reagan. One of his books, entitled A Dud at 70, A Stud at 80: How To Do It features a cover with Johnson, 80, and his thirty-something girlfriend.

Death 
Johnson died at his home in San Diego on January 21, 1996. He was survived by a son and daughter in San Diego, 3 grandchildren, 9 great grandchildren, and 1 great great grandchild.

New York City Marathon records
84 Year Olds  in 5 Hours, 42 Minutes, 19 Seconds
88 Year Olds  in 7 Hours, 40 Minutes, 58 Seconds
90 Year Olds  Did Not Finish

At the age of 85, Johnson was the oldest runner in the 1984 NYC marathon.

Books by Noel Johnson
A Dud at 70, A Stud at 80: How To Do It By Noel Johnson, 1981
The Living Proof, 1990

References

Training Regimen Described

American male marathon runners
Boxers from Minnesota
Senior Olympic competitors
1899 births
1996 deaths
American male boxers